The Men's Quadruple Sculls took place at the Lagoa Rodrigo de Freitas. The heats and repechages happened on July 16 and the Finals on July 19.

Medals

Race for Lanes

Final A

Rowing at the 2007 Pan American Games